"Requiem" is the twenty-second episode and the finale of the seventh season of the science fiction television series The X-Files, and the show's 161st episode overall. It premiered on the Fox network in the United States on May 21, 2000. The episode was written by Chris Carter, and directed by Kim Manners. The episode helped to explore the series' overarching mythology. "Requiem" earned a Nielsen household rating of 8.9, being watched by 15.26 million viewers in its initial broadcast. The episode received mostly positive reviews from television critics. Many applauded the way it made the series' increasingly marginalized alien mythology relevant again, although others lamented the partial loss of David Duchovny.

The show centers on FBI special agents Fox Mulder (Duchovny) and Dana Scully (Gillian Anderson) who work on cases linked to the paranormal, called X-Files. Mulder is a believer in the paranormal, while the skeptical Scully has been assigned to debunk his work. In this episode, Mulder and Scully return to the site of their first investigation together when a series of abductions take place. However, Scully's failing health, and Mulder's concern that she is in danger, cause him to take her off the case. Meanwhile, the Cigarette-Smoking Man (William B. Davis)—on his deathbed—reunites with Marita Covarrubias (Laurie Holden) and Alex Krycek in an attempt to revive the project.

"Requiem" was a story milestone for the series, featuring the alien abduction of Mulder. Mulder would appear sporadically in the last two seasons, only returning for about half of the episodes in season eight and only two episodes in season nine. Prior to being picked up for another season, however, many believed that the episode would serve as the series finale. As such, many elements from the show's pilot episode were brought in to bring the show closure and help it segue into a movie franchise.

Plot
In Bellefleur, Oregon, Sheriff's Department Detective Miles drives to the scene of a reported air crash in the forest. When Miles arrives, his car's electricity cuts out, causing it to crash. After exiting the vehicle, an injured Miles finds a fellow deputy sheriff, Ray Hoese, unconscious in his police cruiser. Miles is suddenly confronted by a man identical to Hoese who is bleeding green fluid, indicating he is an Alien Bounty Hunter. Later, in Tunisia, Marita Covarrubias arranges for the release of Alex Krycek from a penal colony. Upon returning to the U.S., the two meet with the wheelchair-bound Smoking Man, who tells them that an alien craft has crashed in Oregon. The Smoking Man sees the crash as a chance to rebuild the Project, but claims that finding it will be complicated.

In Oregon, two teenage boys, Gary and Richie, are exploring the crash site when they encounter Detective Miles, who denies any crash or the fire that was reported in the area. While they go through the area on their own, Gary is lifted off the ground and shaken by an invisible force, and Richie, although he stands within a few feet of him, can't see him. Meanwhile, in Washington, Fox Mulder receives a call from Billy Miles, an abductee from Bellefleur whom the agents encountered seven years prior. The younger Miles tells him about Hoese's disappearance, and his concern that the abductions have begun again.

The following morning, Mulder and Dana Scully arrive in Bellefleur, where they investigate the road where the incidents took place. Upon meeting Billy, they find he has become a local police officer. The agents also meet "Detective Miles", unaware that he is a disguised Bounty Hunter who has killed Billy's father. At the scene of Hoese's disappearance, Scully finds three bullet casings, indicating that the deputy fired his weapon before vanishing. The agents later speak with Hoese's wife and are surprised when she is revealed to be Theresa Nemman, one of the other 1992 abductees. Later, while going through case files, Scully becomes ill.

That night, Theresa is awakened by someone at her door. Mulder and Scully arrive at her house to find it being investigated by police, with Billy informing them that Theresa was taken in the night. Scully suddenly feels nauseous, much to Billy's concern, but she quickly shakes it off. Later, while investigating the crash site, Scully is lifted and shaken just as Gary was. Mulder finds her nearly passed out on the ground. Meanwhile, Billy enters his home and pulls his gun on the man who appears to be his father. After the confrontation, Billy relinquishes his gun, at which point the other man physically morphs and reveals himself to be the Bounty Hunter. At that point, Mulder and Scully pull up and walk into the house, unable to locate Billy or his father.

When Mulder and Scully return to Washington, Walter Skinner approaches them in their office, where they are joined by Marita and Krycek. Marita reveals that the Smoking Man is dying and that he wants to find the UFO in Oregon to restart the Project. Krycek informs them that the UFO is hidden behind an energy field. The group, along with the Lone Gunmen, find evidence pinpointing the UFO's location. Mulder makes it clear to Scully that he is concerned for her health and refuses to let her accompany him back to Oregon. Reciprocating his concern, Scully refuses to let Mulder return alone; Skinner accompanies Mulder instead.

While investigating the incident back in Washington, Scully and the Lone Gunmen find evidence that it was Mulder, not Scully, who would be in danger at the Oregon abduction site. However, immediately upon discovering this, Scully becomes sick to such a degree that the Lone Gunmen have her rushed to the hospital. Meanwhile, Mulder and Skinner travel to the woods, equipped with lasers for finding the UFO. Noticing a spot where the lasers cease in mid-air, Mulder walks through the energy field. He finds and joins a group of abductees, including Billy and Theresa, standing below a pillar of light from a UFO; they are soon accosted by the Bounty Hunter. Mulder vanishes with the group while a stunned Skinner witnesses the UFO's departure.

At the Watergate, Krycek and Marita come to visit the Smoking Man, who is already aware of his plan's failure but is resigned to his fate. With Marita holding back his assistant, Krycek wheels the Smoking Man out of the room and throws him down a flight of stairs, presumably killing him. After being hospitalized, Scully tells Skinner that, although she cannot understand it — and that it is important that he keep it secret — she is pregnant.

Production

Background and writing

While filming was underway for the seventh season, many members of the crew felt that the show had entered into its final season. Executive producer Frank Spotnitz later explained that "there was a pretty strong sentiment inside and outside the show that it was time to call it a day." As the season progressed, however, the idea of producing another season emerged. Paul Rabwin explained that, "we found ourselves starting to get energized again. [...] As we got toward the end of the season, everyone was kind of hopeful." As such, when it came time to pen "Requiem", the producers considered several ways to deal with the episode. The first idea was that "Requiem" could serve a series finale. Another idea that emerged was that the episode could end on a cliffhanger, leading into an eighth season or an X-Files movie. The former idea was chosen, leading to series creator Chris Carter writing "Requiem" as segue into season eight.

"Requiem" attempted to bring closure to several aspects of the series. In one sequence, Alex Krycek throws The Smoking Man down a flight of stairs, presumably to his death. Nicholas Lea, the actor who portrayed Krycek, noted: "That's one of the character's great moments, when I get to push Bill Davis down a set of stairs. In a sense, he has nothing to lose because his life's burned out. So death doesn't have the same terror that it would to a young happy chap." The episode also featured several tender moments between Mulder and Scully, which many fans found "nearly pornographic in the context of their long, chaste courtship", according to Matt Hurwitz and Chris Knowles in their book The Complete X-Files. Gillian Anderson, however, defended the moments, arguing that there was ample amount of romance between Mulder and Scully prior to "Requiem". The ending scene, featuring Scully revealing that she is pregnant, was written the day before it was filmed. Carter held it back because he "didn't want to create something that would let the cat out of the bag and give anybody the opportunity to spoil our fun."

Casting and filming

Because there was a chance that the seventh season would be its last, the character of Billy Miles, played by Zachary Ansley and who originally appeared in the pilot episode, was brought back in and featured in "Requiem" to bring the series full-circle. Ansley would also appear in several eighth season episodes as well. After the conclusion of the episode, David Duchovny expressed his desire to leave the series. He explained, "I was kind of a free agent after season seven, and to me, there was not much else to do in terms of the character. So it was really about me wanting to pursue other parts of my career as a writer, director, and actor." Rumors began spreading—which were eventually confirmed—that another character would take Mulder's place. Many fans on the internet believed that Mitch Pileggi, who portrayed Walter Skinner, would take the role; Pileggi later called this guess "ridiculous."

The episode was directed by Kim Manners. Originally, Carter had planned on directing the episode himself, but he eventually felt that it would be better handled by Manners. Manners later noted that he felt "very honored" by this gesture. Principal shooting for the episode began on Soundstage 5 at the Twentieth Century Fox lot on April 20, 2000. Because large parts of this episode as well as the pilot are supposed to take place in the same fictional city of Bellefleur, Oregon. This caused something of an issue, as the pilot had originally been shot on location in Lynn Valley in North Vancouver, British Columbia, in the Lower Seymour Conservation Reserve—formerly known as the Seymour Demonstration Forest. Since production had moved from Vancouver to Los Angeles after the conclusion of the fifth season, a local California location was needed to stand in for Oregon. Consequently, when the cast and crew of the series finished filming at the Fox lot, they relocated to the Big Bear resort, located near Big Bear Lake, California, which was very evocative of Vancouver, thereby providing an "ideal backdrop" for the episode.

The episode featured several elaborate effects, created through both digital and physical means. The scene in which Scully encounters an alien forcefield was created with the use of a special effects harness. Effects producer Bill Millar created many of the special effects for the episode—including shots of the alien craft as well as its interaction with people—in a building in Big Bear. The episode contains a shot of Detective Miles morphing into the alien bounty hunter, which required various shots of Leon Russom and Brian Thompson to be spliced together via blue screen technology. Producer Paul Rabwin called the shot in this episode "one of the best morphs we've ever done."

Themes

"Requiem" explores Mulder's desire to leave his pursuit of the truth behind him. Michelle Bush, in her book Myth-X notes that the episode's theme, in a colloquial sense, is Mulder's "realization that maybe it's time to get out of the car". The irony of the episode, however, is that as soon as Mulder discovers absolute proof of alien life, he is subsequently abducted and taken away.

While in Skinner's office, the camera angles and position of the characters recall Leonardo da Vinci's famous painting The Last Supper. Skinner is standing in Saint Peter's spot, and Scully is standing in Judas Iscariot's place. Bush argues that, in this manner, the show is suggesting that Scully, like Judas, directly affects the fate of the savior, in this case Mulder. She notes that Scully's actions result in a fate that "could not be realized without her participation". This is not the first time Scully has been compared to Judas in the show: the earlier episode "The Sixth Extinction II: Amor Fati"—which is heavily based on Nikos Kazantzakis's novel The Last Temptation of Christ—features Scully in a role with direct literary parallels to Kazantzakis's heroic interpretation of Judas.

Reception

Ratings
"Requiem" first aired on Fox in the United States on May 21, 2000. This episode earned a Nielsen rating of 8.9, with a 14 share, meaning that roughly 8.9 percent of all television-equipped households, and 14 percent of households watching television, were tuned into the episode. It was viewed by 15.26 million viewers. "Requiem" marked a 3.8 percent decrease in viewers from the sixth season finale, "Biogenesis" and a 14.4 percent decrease from the seventh season premiere, "The Sixth Extinction." The episode aired in the United Kingdom and Ireland on Sky1 on August 13, 2000, and received 1.00 million viewers, making it the most watched episode that week. On May 13, 2003, the episode was released on DVD as part of the complete seventh season. Two years later the episode was included on The X-Files Mythology, Volume 3 – Colonization, a DVD collection that contains episodes involving the alien colonists.

Reviews
The episode received mostly positive reviews from critics. Emily VanDerWerff of The A.V. Club awarded the episode a "B+". She argued that the episode was "the best season finale cliffhanger the show ever did", and compared it to the second season finale "Anasazi"; she noted that while the latter episode was "pretty amazing", "Requiem" has "a finality" to it and a "sense that nothing will ever be the same" that made its cliffhanger ending work. VanDerWerff also wrote that the references to the pilot episode helped to show how far the series had evolved in seven years. Tom Kessenich, in his book Examinations, gave the episode a largely positive review. Despite lamenting the loss of Fox Mulder, he noted that "the truth is The X-Files has been a show like no other and 'Requiem' proved once again there truly is a place for magic and beauty and love on the small screen and I am delighted to have witnessed it for seven seasons now." Kessenich later named the episode one of the "Top 25 Episode of All Time" of The X-Files, ranking it at number 20.

Kenneth Silber from Space.com called the episode "intriguing" and felt that while "The X-Files "foundered" for a large portion of its seventh season, "Requiem" marked "a much-needed return to that mythology," and that it set "the stage for what might be an interesting eighth season." Rich Rosell from DigitallyObsessed.com awarded the episode 4.5 out of 5 stars and wrote that "A lot of characters out of the woodwork come back for the season-ending cliffhanger [...] But that's all window-dressing for a trio of big surprises that wrap up Season 7, in what many consider the show's death knell, or perhaps just a proper ending." Robert Shearman and Lars Pearson, in their book Wanting to Believe: A Critical Guide to The X-Files, Millennium & The Lone Gunmen, rated the episode four stars out of five. The two noted that, despite the fact that it capped-off a "lacklustre" season, the episode still managed to provide a good enough cliffhanger to hold fans until the premiere of the eighth season. Shearman and Pearson further noted that "against the odds, after all the disappointments of the year, 'Requiem' is strong enough to leave its audience wanting more."

Paula Vitaris from Cinefantastique gave the episode a more mixed review and awarded it two stars out of four. Despite noting that the episode was "the best mytharc episode and season finale in years", she called the episode's finale "one of the most egregious missteps yet in The X-Files mythology".

Explanatory notes

Footnotes

Bibliography

External links

2000 American television episodes
Television episodes written by Chris Carter
Television episodes about alien abduction
Television episodes set in Oregon
The X-Files (season 7) episodes
Television episodes set in Tunisia